In agriculture, polyculture is the practice of growing more than one crop species in the same space, at the same time. In doing this, polyculture attempts to mimic the diversity of natural ecosystems. Polyculture is the opposite of monoculture, in which only one plant or animal species is cultivated together. Polyculture can improve control of some pests, weeds, and diseases while reducing the need for pesticides. Intercrops of legumes with non-legumes can increase yields on low-nitrogen soils due to biological nitrogen fixation. However, polyculture can reduce crop yields due to competition between the mixed species for light, water, or nutrients. It complicates management as species have different growth rates, days to maturity, and harvest requirements: monoculture is more amenable to mechanisation. For these reasons, many farmers in large-scale agriculture continue to rely on monoculture and use crop rotation to add diversity to the system.

Other forms of polyculture can be found in permaculture and integrated aquaculture.

Historical and modern uses 

Polyculture has traditionally been the most prevalent form of agriculture. A well-known example of historic polyculture is the intercropping of maize, beans, and squash plants in a group often referred to as "the three sisters". In this combination, the maize provides a structure for the bean to grow on, the bean provides nitrogen for all of the plants, while the squash suppresses weeds on the ground. This crop mixture can be traced back several thousand years to civilizations in Mesoamerica and is representative of how species in polycultures sustain each other and minimize the need for human intervention. Integrated aquaculture, or the growing of seafood and plants together, has been common in parts of Eastern Asia for several thousand years as well. In China and Japan, for example, fish and shrimp have historically been grown in ponds with rice and seaweed. Other countries where polycultures have traditionally been a substantial part of agriculture, and continue to be so today, include those in the Himalayan region, Eastern Asia, South America, and Africa.

Because of the development of pesticides, herbicides, and fertilizers, monoculture became the predominant form of agriculture in the 1950s. The prevalence of polycultures declined greatly in popularity at that time in more economically developed countries where it was deemed to yield less while requiring more labor. Polyculture farming has not disappeared entirely, and traditional polyculture systems continue to be an essential part of the food production system today. Around 15% to 20% of the world's agriculture is estimated to rely on traditional polyculture systems. The majority of Latin American farmers continue to intercrop their maize, beans, and squash. Due to climate change, polycultures are regaining popularity in more-developed countries as food producers seek to reduce their environmental and health impacts.

Common practices 

The kinds of plants that are grown, their spatial distribution, and the time that they spend growing together determine the specific type of polyculture that is implemented. There is no limit to the types of plants or animals that can be grown together to form a polyculture. The time overlap between plants can be asymmetrical as well, with one plant depending on the other for longer than is reciprocated, often due to differences in life spans.

Annual polycultures

Intercropping 

When more than two crops are grown in complete spatial and temporal overlap with each other, it is referred to as intercropping. Intercropping is particularly useful in plots with limited land availability. Legumes are among of the most commonly intercropped crops, specifically legume-cereal mixtures. Legumes fix atmospheric nitrogen into the soil so that it is available for consumption by other plants in a process known as nitrogen fixation. The presence of legumes consequently eliminates the need for man-made nitrogen fertilizers in intercrops.

Cover cropping 

When a crop is grown alongside another plant that is not a crop, the combination is a form of cover cropping. If the non-crop plant is a weed, the combination is called a weedy culture. Grasses and legumes are the most common cover crops. Cover crops are greatly beneficial as they can help prevent soil erosion, physically suppress weeds, improve surface water retention, and, in the case of legumes, provide nitrogen compounds as well. Single-species cover cropping, in rotation with cash crops, increases agroecosystem diversity; a cover crop polyculture further increases that diversity, and there is evidence, using a range of cover crop treatments with or without legumes, that this increases ecosystem functionality, in terms of weed suppression, nitrogen retention, and above-ground biomass.

Strip cropping 

Strip cropping is a form of polyculture that involves growing different plants in alternating rows. While strip cropping does not involve the complete intermixing of plant species, it still provides many of the same benefits such as preventing soil erosion and aiding with nutrient cycling.

Permaculture 

Permaculture is the polyculture of perennial plants such as legume-grass mixtures and wildflower mixtures. Popular in Europe and other temperate climates, permaculture can increase soil fertility through nitrogen fixation, decrease soil erosion, regulate water consumption, and decrease the need for tillage, thereby conserving soil nutrients. Permaculture requires even less human intervention than other forms of polyculture because of lower harvest and tillage rates.

In many Latin American countries, a popular form of permaculture is agroforestry, where trees and crops are grown together. Trees provide shade for the crops alongside organic matter and nutrients when they shed their leaves or fruits. The elaborate root systems of trees also help prevent soil erosion and increase the presence of microbes in the soil. In addition to benefiting crops, trees act as commodities themselves for use in paper, medicine, firewood, etc. Growing coffee plants alongside other tree species in Mexico is a common example of agroforestry.

Coffee is a shade-loving crop, and is traditionally shade-grown. In India, it is often grown under a natural forest canopy, replacing the shrub layer. A different polyculture system is used for coffee in Mexico, where the Coffea bushes are grown under leguminous trees in the genus Inga.

One approach to sustainability is to develop polyculture systems by breeding perennial crop varieties of traditional annual arable crops. Perennial crops require less tillage and often have longer roots than annual varieties, helping to reduce soil erosion and tolerate drought. Such varieties are being developed for rice, wheat, sorghum, pigeon pea, barley, and sunflowers. If these can be combined in polyculture with a leguminous cover crop such as alfalfa, fixation of nitrogen will be added to the system, reducing the need for fertilizer and pesticides.

Some traditional systems have combined polyculture with sustainability. In South-East Asia, rice-fish systems on rice paddies have raised freshwater fish as well as rice, producing a valuable additional crop and reducing eutrophication of neighbouring rivers. A variant in Indonesia combines rice, fish, ducks and water fern for a resilient and productive permaculture system; the ducks eat the weeds that would otherwise limit rice growth, reducing labour and herbicides, while the duck manure and fish manure reduce the need for fertilizer.

Integrated aquaculture 

Integrated aquaculture is a form of aquaculture in which cultures of fish or shrimp are grown together with seaweed, shellfish, or micro-algae. Mono-species aquaculture, a form of aquaculture in which members of only one species are grown together, poses several problems for farmers and the environment. The harvesting of seaweed crops in mono-species aquaculture, for example, releases nitrates into the water and can lead to severe eutrophication, as has occurred in the Venice Lagoon. In terms of seafood growth, the greatest problem in mono-species aquaculture is the high cost of feed, which accounts for about half of production costs. However, more than half of seafood feed is shown to go to waste and can lead to further problems with excess nitrogen release and eutrophication or algal blooms of freshwater. Many technological approaches to reducing these harmful environmental effects, such as bacterial bio-filters, have proved to consume high levels of energy and to be economically costly.

As such, many farmers have transitioned towards integrated aquaculture. In integrated aquaculture, plants serve a dual purpose, acting as food for the sea animals and as a water filtration device for the surrounding environment, absorbing nitrates and excess carbon dioxide. Nutrients can be recycled between plants and animals, reducing the need for chemical nutrient supplements. Plants such as seaweed that are grown alongside seafood often hold significant commercial value by themselves, so incorporating them into already existing seafood monocultures increases economic value.

Functions

Pest management 
Pests are less predominant in polycultures than monocultures due to crop diversity. The reduced concentration of a target species makes polycultures less appealing to pests that have a strong preference towards that specific crop. These specialized pests will often have more difficulty locating a favorable host plant in a polyculture than in a monoculture. If a pest has more generalized preferences, it will leave more quickly to other plants in the polyculture and as such will have a lesser effect on any one plant. When pests are present in the nearby area, polycultures may experience lower yield loss than monocultures, a theory known as the associational resistance hypothesis. Because polycultures mimic naturally diverse ecosystems, general pests are also less likely to distinguish between polycultures and the surrounding environment. As such, pests are inclined to move freely between the two environments, and have a relatively smaller in presence in the polyculture.

Because of the diversity of plants in a polyculture, the natural enemies, or predators, of pests are also often attracted to the polyculture alongside the pests. These natural enemies help suppress pest populations while doing no harm to the plants themselves.

Disease control 

Plant diseases are less predominant in polycultures than monocultures. The disease-diversity hypothesis states that a greater diversity of plants leads to a decreased severity of disease. Because different plants are susceptible to different diseases, if a disease negatively impacts one crop, it will not necessarily spread to another and so the overall impact is contained. However, the type of disease and the susceptibility of the specific plants inside the polyculture to a particular disease can vary greatly.

Weed management 

Both the density and the diversity of crops affect weed growth in polycultures. Having a greater density of plants reduces the available water, sunlight, and nutrient concentrations in the environment. Such a reduction is heightened with greater crop diversity as more potential resources are fully utilized. This level of competition makes polycultures particularly inhospitable to weeds.

When they do grow, weeds can help polycultures, assisting in pest management by attracting natural enemies of pests. They can also act as hosts to arthropods that are beneficial to other plants in the polyculture.

Sequestering carbon 

Regenerative ocean farming is a polyculture farming system that sequesters carbon. It grows a mix of seaweeds and shellfish for harvest, while helping to regenerate and restore local habitats like reef ecosystems.

Advantages

Sustainability 

Because polyculture uses methods of pest, disease, and weed control that do not rely on human intervention, pesticides are not released into the environment. Fertilizer use is reduced as well, as diverse plants more fully share and use all available soil and atmospheric nutrients. As such, environmental impacts such as eutrophication of fresh water or the presence of excess atmospheric nitrogen are greatly reduced.

Other negative impacts of modern agriculture are similarly reduced. Excessive tillage occurs in most modern agricultural practices, but removes essential microbes and nutrients from the soil that are conserved in polyculture, especially permaculture. Because polyculture relies on natural systems of crop maintenance, farmers save money on machinery.
Growing multiple plants or animals together in the same space is a more productive use of agricultural land, a critical resource taking up 40% of the world's land area.

Polyculture increases local biodiversity. Increasing crop diversity can increase pollination in nearby environments, as diverse plants attract a broader array of pollinators. This is one example of reconciliation ecology, or accommodating biodiversity within human landscapes. This may also form part of a biological pest control program.

Human health 
The chemicals used in monoculture food production can be directly harmful to human health when released into the environment. Nitrogen is a chemical found in especially high concentrations in fertilizers. Nitrates from these fertilizers often become integrated in water sources due to agricultural runoff. The consumption of nitrates at high doses has been shown to lead to methemoglobinemia in infants.

Many of the crops consumed today are calorie-rich crops that can lead to illnesses such as obesity, hypertension, and type II diabetes. Because it encourages plant diversity, polyculture can help increase diet diversity by incorporating non-traditional foods into agriculture and people's diets.

Effectiveness 

The effects of interspecific competition and intraspecific competition can cause great damage to plants in certain polycultures. In order for a polyculture to be effective, the diverse species that are a part of it must have distinct biological needs such as absorbing different nutrients or requiring different amounts of sunlight as stated by the competitive exclusion principle. Due to the large number of plant species that are cultivated by humans, finding and testing combinations of plants where interspecific and intraspecific competition do not significantly negatively affect the individual plants is extremely difficult. As such, for crops where historic polycultures do not exist, such a multiplicity makes the creation of new polycultures a significant issue.

Crop yield is an issue in polycultures. While a polyculture produces more biomass overall than a monoculture, individual crops inside of the polyculture are not as prevalent. When there is a focal crop whose cultivation is especially important for a society a lower yield for a certain crop may pose food availability issues.

Similarly, while diseases and pests affect a polyculture less as a group, they do not necessarily have a decreased effect on a focal crop. If targeted by a specialized pest or disease, a focal crop in a polyculture will likely experience the same yield loss as its monoculture counterpart.

Polyculture also often requires more labor.

See also

 Agroecology
 Aquaponics
 Beneficial weeds
 Companion planting
 Forest gardening
 Heirloom plant
 Holistic management
 Integrated multi-trophic aquaculture
 Monoculture
 Nurse crop

References

External links
 Crop rotation and polyculture
 Polycultures in the Brazilian drylands
 Polyculture and disease prevention

Permaculture
Permaculture concepts
Agricultural terminology
Biological pest control
Agroecology
Agroforestry